Jan Baptist van Fornenburgh (1585 in Antwerp – 1650 in The Hague), was a Dutch Golden Age flower painter.

According to the RKD he signed his works with a monogram "IBVF" or sometimes just "IB". He worked in Amsterdam and Vianen, as well as the Hague, where he became a member of the Confrerie Pictura in 1629. He was a follower of Balthasar van der Ast and Jacob de Gheyn II.

Work 
In addition to flowers, van Fornenburgh also painted dead birds and fruits or objects, both in oil and in watercolor on parchment.

References

Jan Baptist van Fornenburgh on Artnet

1585 births
1650 deaths
Dutch Golden Age painters
Dutch male painters
Artists from Antwerp
Painters from The Hague
Flower artists